Marrett may refer to:

Damian Marrett, writer of non-fiction crime books in Melbourne, Victoria
George J. Marrett (born 1935), former United States Air Force officer, combat veteran, and test pilot
Henry Norman Marrett (born 1879), badminton player from England
Marrett House, historic home in Standish, Maine, USA

See also
Marett
Maretto
Marietta (disambiguation)
Mariette
Marriott (disambiguation)
Merrett